Isabellaria is a genus of gastropods belonging to the family Clausiliidae.

The species of this genus are found in Mediterranean.

Species:
Isabellaria abyssoclista 
Isabellaria almae 
Isabellaria bathyclista 
Isabellaria clandestina 
Isabellaria isabellina 
Isabellaria lutracana 
Isabellaria parnassia 
Isabellaria perplana 
Isabellaria regina 
Isabellaria riedeli 
Isabellaria saxicola 
Isabellaria sericata 
Isabellaria thermopylarum

References

Clausiliidae